Nelakurihi Sikki Reddy (born 18 August 1993) is an Indian badminton player who plays doubles and mixed doubles. In 2016, she won the Brazil and Russia Open Grand Prix title in the mixed doubles event partnered with Pranaav Chopra. She and Chopra also won the gold medal at the South Asian Games.

Achievements

Commonwealth Games 
Women's doubles

South Asian Games 
Women's doubles

Mixed doubles

BWF World Tour (3 runners-up) 
The BWF World Tour, which was announced on 19 March 2017 and implemented in 2018, is a series of elite badminton tournaments sanctioned by the Badminton World Federation (BWF). The BWF World Tours are divided into levels of World Tour Finals, Super 1000, Super 750, Super 500, Super 300 (part of the HSBC World Tour), and the BWF Tour Super 100.

Women's doubles

Mixed doubles

BWF Grand Prix (3 titles, 2 runners-up) 
The BWF Grand Prix had two levels, the Grand Prix and Grand Prix Gold. It was a series of badminton tournaments sanctioned by the Badminton World Federation (BWF) and played between 2007 and 2017.

Women's doubles

Mixed doubles

  BWF Grand Prix Gold tournament
  BWF Grand Prix tournament

BWF International Challenge/Series (10 titles, 11 runners-up) 
Women's doubles

Mixed doubles

  BWF International Challenge tournament
  BWF International Series tournament

Personal life 
Sikki Reddy married her fellow badminton player B. Sumeeth Reddy in February 2019.

References

External links
 
 

1993 births
Living people
Racket sportspeople from Telangana
Sportswomen from Hyderabad, India
People from Suryapet district
Indian female badminton players
Indian national badminton champions
Badminton players at the 2018 Commonwealth Games
Commonwealth Games gold medallists for India
Commonwealth Games bronze medallists for India
Commonwealth Games medallists in badminton
Badminton players at the 2014 Asian Games
Badminton players at the 2018 Asian Games
Asian Games bronze medalists for India
Asian Games medalists in badminton
Medalists at the 2014 Asian Games
South Asian Games gold medalists for India
South Asian Games silver medalists for India
South Asian Games bronze medalists for India
South Asian Games medalists in badminton
Recipients of the Arjuna Award
21st-century Indian women
21st-century Indian people
Medallists at the 2018 Commonwealth Games